Amguulan (阿穆隆) (born August 30, 1984), commonly known as Amulong or Amu, is a Chinese singer and songwriter of Mongolian descent.  He competed in the 2007 edition of the singing competition show Super Boy on Hunan Television.

Filmography

References

Seed Music Artist Profile
EE-Media Artist Profile
Hunan TV Super Boys Singing Contest Contestant Profile (in Simplified Chinese)
 Super Boys Singing Contest Article on Wikipedia Chinese
2009 ModernSky Strawberry Music Festival

External links
Official Fansite (in Simplified Chinese) – www.amguulan.com
Amguulan's Blog (in Simplified Chinese)
Amguulan's Post Bar (in Simplified Chinese)
Amguulan's Music Post Bar (in Simplified Chinese)
Amguulan's Yahoo-Kimo Club (in Traditional Chinese)

1984 births
Living people
Male actors from Inner Mongolia
Chinese people of Mongolian descent
Chinese male singer-songwriters
People from Xilingol League
Singers from Inner Mongolia
Chinese male film actors
Super Boy contestants